Pascal Mayer is a french scientist who was awarded Breakthrough Prize in Life Sciences in 2022 for researching paved way for inexpensive and rapid DNA sequencing around the world.

References 

French scientists
Living people
1963 births